Jason Hoogerwerf (born 10 December 1966) is an Australian former professional rugby league footballer who played in the 1980s and 1990s. He played for the St. George Dragons from 1988 to 1990 and the Newcastle Knights in 1991.

References

External links
http://www.rugbyleagueproject.org/players/Jason_Hoogerwerf/summary.html

Australian rugby league players
St. George Dragons players
Newcastle Knights players
Living people
1966 births
Place of birth missing (living people)
Rugby league props